Muhanga is a town in the Western Region of Uganda. It is the main commercial centre and largest town of Rukiga District. However, the district headquarters are located at Mparo.

Location
The geographical coordinates of Muhanga, Rukiga are: 01°10'16.0"S, 30°07'27.0"E (Latitude:-1.171111; Longitude:30.124167).

Overview
The town is subdivided into several wards, including (a) Muhanga Central (b) Butare (c) Highland (d) Nyakabungo and (e) Rutare. Muhanga became a town council in 2010. Prior to that, it was a trading center, established in the 1970s. Due to its proximity to the international border with Rwanda, smuggling of goods across the common border has contributed to its rapid growth. The smuggling has since stopped, according to James Tumwijukye, the town's current mayor.

Population
According to the Uganda Bureau of Statistics (UBOS), as of the August 2014 national census and household survey, Muhanga Town Council comprised 2,766 households. The average family size was 4.1, with a total of 5,87 males and 5,859 females in the town. The total population of the town at that time was 11,706 people.

Points of interest
Muhanga has a central fresh produce market that opens daily. The town is also home to Bukinda Primary Teacher’s College, eight primary schools and six secondary schools.

References

External links
Rukiga District Web Portal

Populated places in Western Region, Uganda
Cities in the Great Rift Valley
Rukiga District